The Black Parade is the third studio album by American rock band My Chemical Romance. Released in Europe on October 20, 2006, through Reprise Records, it was produced by the band with Rob Cavallo, known for having produced multiple albums for the Goo Goo Dolls and Green Day. It is a rock opera centering on a dying character with cancer known as "The Patient". The album tells the story of his apparent death, experiences in the afterlife, and subsequent reflections on his life. It is the band's only studio album to feature drummer Bob Bryar before his departure in 2010.

The Black Parade has received generally favorable reviews, and the band achieved its first number one single in the United Kingdom with "Welcome to the Black Parade". The album debuted at number two on both the Billboard 200 and the UK Albums Chart and is also certified as Triple Platinum in the United States (by the RIAA) and the United Kingdom (by the BPI), as well as Gold certifications in both Argentina (by the CAPIF) and Chile (by the IFPI Chile). The Black Parade was given the Platinum Europe Award by the International Federation of the Phonographic Industry for one million sales in Europe. The limited edition boxed set also earned My Chemical Romance a nomination at the 2008 Grammy Awards. Four singles were released from the album: "Welcome to the Black Parade", "Famous Last Words", "I Don't Love You", and "Teenagers".

My Chemical Romance began The Black Parade World Tour on February 22, 2007, in the Manchester, New Hampshire, Verizon Wireless Arena. The tour featured 138 performances worldwide, as well as several festival and condensed shows. The tour was the longest and most internationally comprehensive headlining tour the band played, featuring three legs in North America, two legs in Europe, and one in Asia, Australia, and Latin America.

The song "Dead!" appears in the Xbox 360 version of Guitar Hero II, and the three songs "Teenagers," "Famous Last Words" and "This Is How I Disappear" were once available as downloadable content. The Black Parade has sold three million copies in the United States as of 2016, and four million worldwide. The record was reissued as The Black Parade/Living with Ghosts on September 23, 2016, in celebration of the tenth anniversary of the album's release. In 2020, Rolling Stone ranked the album number 361 in their updated 500 Greatest Albums of All Time.

Musical and lyrical themes
The Black Parade is a rock opera centering around the character of "The Patient". It is about his passage out of life and the memories he has of it. "The Patient" dies and death comes for him in the form of a parade. This is based on singer Gerard Way's notion of death appearing to a person in the form of their fondest memory, in this case seeing a marching band as a child.

The album also saw the creation of the alter-ego band, The Black Parade. My Chemical Romance performed the album live in costume as the Black Parade until their October 7, 2007, Mexico City performance. On stage, the band donned black marching uniforms similar to those worn by The Beatles for the album Sgt. Pepper's Lonely Hearts Club Band (1967). The live performance was theatrical, with Way assuming the character of a member of The Black Parade. His mannerisms were compared to Bob Geldof's performance of the lead character in the movie adaptation of Pink Floyd's The Wall (1979), David Bowie's performance as Ziggy Stardust with Freddie Mercury's stage presence.  There are also similarities to Alice Cooper in his Welcome to My Nightmare period. The video Welcome to the Black Parade, directed by Samuel Bayer, portrays the events of the entire story starring all its characters, including Mother War, who is primarily involved in the song "Mama".

Way has cited the bands Queen and Pink Floyd as major influences on the album. Similarities have been noted between the guitar orchestration in "Welcome to the Black Parade", and the arrangements of Queen. Additionally, Pink Floyd's The Wall, The Beatles’ Sgt. Pepper’s Lonely Hearts Club Band, Queen's A Night at the Opera (1975) and David Bowie's The Rise and Fall of Ziggy Stardust and the Spiders from Mars (1972) are noted as major influences for the album, which is especially evident when comparing the album's opening track, "The End.", to the first tracks on The Wall, "In the Flesh?", and on Ziggy Stardust, "Five Years". Way has also said one of their biggest influences were The Smashing Pumpkins, often giving them credit for their thematic videos. "The intention was to make something that was classic, something timeless," explained guitarist Ray Toro. "Something that 20 or 30 years from now, parents could play for their kids and say, 'This is what I was listening to when I was your age. Check it out, it’s still cool.' We wanted to make a record you could pass down. There’s a lot of music out now that doesn’t feel like that."

The album also has strong influences from 1970s classic rock, glam rock, pop music, soft rock, arena rock, metal, hard rock, and gothic rock. The Black Parade has been described as alternative rock, emo, pop punk, hard rock, punk rock, progressive rock, and post-hardcore.

Looking back at the creation of the album, guitarist Frank Iero was "blasé about people hating on the band for this decidedly 'non-scene' record": "When we did Three Cheers For Sweet Revenge, we didn't fit in," he said. "There was a little less screaming and a little more melody, but it was still us. Never was it a case of, 'Don't put that melody there because Hardcore Chuck, who took me to my first show at Fairfield American Legion Hall, is really going to be bummed at me.' I don’t care: If I had to work at McDonald's for the rest of my life to play shows and ride in a van on tour? I've done it. I'll do it again."

Release and promotion
On July 31, 2006, The Black Parade was announced for release. In August, the band was filming a music video in Los Angeles for "Famous Last Words". During filming, Way tore his ankle ligaments and Bryar suffered burns on his leg. Bryar was hospitalized, which resulted in the band cancelling two shows. On August 25, they released a video of a pre-recorded press conference, during which they revealed a number of details about the album, such as song titles and touring information. On August 31, the band performed at the MTV Video Music Awards preshow in New York, debuting the then new song "Welcome to the Black Parade" during their performance. Two days later, the song was made available for streaming via the band's MySpace account. On September 12, the album's artwork and track listing was revealed. The music video for "Welcome to the Black Parade" was released on September 28. On October 21, the band was the musical guest on an episode of Saturday Night Live, where they performed "Welcome to the Black Parade" and "Cancer".

The Black Parade was made available for streaming on October 19, and was released through Reprise on October 24. In March 2007, the band filmed another music video in Los Angeles, this time for "Teenagers".

Versions

Several special editions of The Black Parade were released. One bears white text on a black background, and the second has black text on a white background. A third version has the normal booklet reversed, showing the picture of the parade drawn and painted by comic artist James Jean. Inside the booklet, there is also a lyric sheet, a photo of the band, and characters from the album.

A limited edition of the album was released the same time as the original release. It contains the same track listing as the original release, but it is sold in a box wrapped in black velveteen material. It also includes a 64-page book which includes concept art by Gerard Way and making of the album notes by the band.

The version of The Black Parade that was released in Japan contains different content than the other regular editions. It contains 14 tracks, but the 14th track is the song "Heaven Help Us" (which was released with the single version of "Welcome to the Black Parade"), instead of the song "Blood". The Japanese version is also an enhanced CD and includes the music video of "Welcome to the Black Parade".

On December 11, 2007, The Black Parade was released as a vinyl LP, a first for the band. Two versions were released, a regular edition and a special edition. Both contain two records. The first record of both editions has tracks one to four on the A-side and five to seven the B-side. The second record has tracks eight to ten on the A-side and 11 to 13 on the B-side. The special edition includes the hidden track "Blood"; the regular edition does not. The special edition comes in a slip-case box with two 15-page books. 2,500 copies of the special edition, and 3,000 copies of the regular vinyl edition were produced. On February 10, 2015, the album was repressed on vinyl as a 2-LP set. The D side of the album includes an engraved picture of the cover of artwork.

In the video game Guitar Hero II (Xbox 360 version), the song "Dead!" was added to the game's track list prior to the earlier PlayStation 2 version, and the three songs "Teenagers," "Famous Last Words" and "This Is How I Disappear" are available for download.

10th anniversary reissue

On July 20, 2016, the band posted on their official Twitter and Facebook pages a video with the piano intro from "Welcome to the Black Parade", ending with a cryptic date, "9/23/16". The video was also published on the band's YouTube channel with the title MCRX. This led to numerous rumors and reports on the band's possible reunion until it was revealed to be a reissue of The Black Parade with unreleased demos. The reissue, titled The Black Parade/Living with Ghosts, includes 11 demos and live tracks. Two months before its release, an early version of "Welcome to the Black Parade", titled "The Five of Us Are Dying", was made available for streaming.

Critical reception

The Black Parade has received generally favorable reviews. At Metacritic, which assigns a normalized rating out of 100 to reviews from mainstream critics, the album received an average score of 79, based on 24 professional critic reviews, which indicates "generally favorable reviews". Dan Martin from NME compared the album to Green Day's American Idiot, positing that "it's a piece of work that will challenge every preconception you ever had about the people who made it." Tim Karan of Alternative Press called The Black Parade "MCR's whole raison d'etre rolled up into one mega-decibel calling card". IGNs Ed Thompson wrote, "The Black Parade is a rock and roll gem that celebrates everything that was over the top about the 1970s rock scene." David Fricke of Rolling Stone praised the classic rock feel of the album. Entertainment Weekly stated that "On their third studio album, a musical H-bomb of an effort, the Jersey quintet combine the rock-opera pomp of Queen with the darker, dirtier tones of their screamo past: Call it a Bro-hemian Rhapsody. Even without its broad concept — a dying cancer patient seeks revenge and redemption — Parade stands as one of the most cohesive, engaging rock records of 2006." Robert Christgau gave the album a two-star honorable mention saying, "In prog, a good sense of humor means so much."

The album was not without its share of criticism, and was panned by The Observer. Jamie Hodgson of The Observer gave it one star saying, "...it reeks of a band with ideas above its station." Theon Weber of Stylus praised the album's use of Queen influences, but went on to summarize the album as "...a goofy record of bubblegum punk, with Queen lapping at its edges and enough good tracks to justify the smattering of empty screamfests."

Accolades
Rolling Stone ranked The Black Parade #20 in its "Top 50 Albums of 2006" feature. It was named the fifth best album of 2006 by Spin magazine. Wizard magazine praised the album in their "Best of 2006" issue, declaring it "an instant classic." IGN named it one of the best rock albums of the last decade. Entertainment Weekly ranked the album as the third best record of the year, surpassed only by Gnarls Barkley and TV on the Radio. It was included in Rock Sounds 101 Modern Classics list at number nine.

Commercial performance
The Black Parade debuted at number two in the United States on the Billboard 200 behind Hannah Montana (2006). It also debuted at number two on the UK Albums Chart, behind Robbie Williams' Rudebox (2006). In its first week, the album sold 240,000 copies, far surpassing the 38,000 best-week sales of the band's previous album, Three Cheers for Sweet Revenge (2004). The band achieved its first number one single in the United Kingdom with "Welcome to the Black Parade".
The album debuted at number three on the Australian ARIA Albums Chart and was certified platinum after shipping more than 70,000 copies. It debuted atop the charts in New Zealand and was certified platinum there, with shipments of more than 15,000. In 2012, The Black Parade was certified Platinum by the International Federation of the Phonographic Industry (IFPI) for one million sales in Europe, and was also  certified Triple Platinum by the RIAA for selling over 1.1 million copies. It has been certified 3× Platinum in the UK, and has sold just over 900,000 units there to date. It received Gold certifications in both Argentina (by the CAPIF) and Chile (by the IFPI Chile). The Black Parade was given the Platinum Europe Award by the International Federation of the Phonographic Industry for one million sales in Europe. The limited edition boxed set also earned My Chemical Romance a nomination for Best Boxed/Special Limited Edition at the 50th Annual Grammy Awards in 2008. As of January 2018 the album had sold over three million copies in the U.S. "Welcome to the Black Parade", a single from The Black Parade became My Chemical Romance's first and only top 10 single in the United States.

Tour

My Chemical Romance began The Black Parade World Tour on February 22, 2007, in Manchester, New Hampshire's Verizon Wireless Arena. The tour featured 138 performances worldwide, as well as several festival and condensed shows. The tour was the longest and most internationally comprehensive headlining tour the band played, featuring three legs in North America, two legs in Europe, and one in Asia, Australia, and Latin America. The shows at the Palacio de los Deportes in Mexico City, Mexico on October 7, 2007, and Maxwell's in Hoboken, New Jersey, on October 24, 2007, were filmed for the DVD, The Black Parade Is Dead!, which was released on July 1, 2008.

Over the course of this tour, My Chemical Romance dubbed themselves The Black Parade for the first part of their performance. This convinced many concert goers that The Black Parade was initially a separate, opening band. During the tour there were several cancellations and some members had to leave the tour for personal or medical reasons. Six shows were cancelled from April 29, 2007, to May 4, 2007, after the band and crew contracted food poisoning.  The band Circa Survive had to replace Muse, whose members also suffered from the same food poisoning. On January 11, 2007, Frank Iero left the tour because of an unspecified illness. He was replaced by Drive By guitarist Todd Price. Mikey Way took time off to get married and spend time with his new wife, Alicia Simmons, and was replaced by guitar tech Matt Cortez from April 18, 2007, until October 4, 2007. Bob Bryar suffered injuries relating to his wrists during the tour which led to the cancellation of the show at the University of Maine on October 27, 2007. Bryar left the tour on November 9, 2007, and was replaced by a friend of the band, who wished to remain anonymous. Following the November 11, 2007, show in Newcastle, Frank Iero left the tour to return home after learning about a family member's illness. He was replaced by Matt Cortez.

Track listing

Personnel

My Chemical Romance
 Bob Bryar – drums, percussion, producer
 Frank Iero – guitars, backing vocals, producer
 Ray Toro – guitars, backing vocals, producer; bass guitar on "Cancer"
 Gerard Way – lead and backing vocals, producer
 Mikey Way – bass guitar (except on "Cancer"), producer

Additional musicians
 Jamie Muhoberac – keyboard, synthesizer, B3 organ, Wurlitzer; piano on "Blood"
 Liza Minnelli – guest vocals on "Mama"
 Rob Cavallo – piano
 David Campbell – strings and horn arrangement

Technical

 Rob Cavallo – producer
 Doug McKean – engineer
 Chris Steffan – recording engineer
 Jimmy Hoyson – assistant engineer
 Jon Herroon – assistant engineer
 Chris Lord-Alge – mixing
 Keith Armstrong – assistant engineer
 Ted Jensen – mastering
 Lars Fox – additional Pro Tools
 Andrew "Hans" Busher – guitar technician
 Tyler Dragness – guitar technician
 Mike "Sack" Fasano  – drum technician
 Cheryl Jenets – project coordinator
 Brain Schechter/Riot Squad – management
 Craig Aaronson – A&R
 Chris Anthony – photography
 Matt Taylor – additional photography on Limited Edition, art direction, design
 Gerard Way – additional photography on Limited Edition, art direction
 Ray Toro – additional photography on Limited Edition
 Ellen Wakayama – art direction
 James Jean – illustrations

Charts

Weekly charts

Year-end charts

Certifications

Release history

Standard edition

Limited edition

See also
 Concept albums

References

External links

 The Black Parade at YouTube (streamed copy where licensed)

 My Chemical Romance official website
 The Black Parade official website

 
My Chemical Romance albums
Emo albums by American artists
Pop punk albums by American artists
Alternative rock albums by American artists
Post-hardcore albums by American artists
Punk rock albums by American artists
2006 albums
Reprise Records albums
Albums produced by Rob Cavallo
Rock operas
Works about cancer
Concept albums